Schleicher's fable is a text composed in a reconstructed version of the Proto-Indo-European (PIE) language, published by August Schleicher in 1868. Schleicher was the first scholar to compose a text in PIE. The fable is entitled  ("The Sheep [Ewe] and the Horses [Eoh]"). At later dates, various scholars have published revised versions of Schleicher's fable, as the idea of what PIE should look like has changed over time. The resulting parallel texts serve as an illustration of the significant changes that the reconstructed language has gone through during the last 150 years of scholarly efforts.

The first revision of Schleicher's fable was made by Hermann Hirt (published by Arntz in 1939). A second revision was published by Winfred Lehmann and Ladislav Zgusta in 1979. Another version by Douglas Q. Adams appeared in the Encyclopedia of Indo-European Culture (1997:501). In 2007 Frederik Kortlandt published yet another version on his homepage.

The Sheep and the Horses

Schleicher (1868)

Schleicher's German translation

English translation

The Sheep and the Horses

A sheep that had no wool saw horses, one of them pulling a heavy wagon, one carrying a big load, and one carrying a man quickly. The sheep said to the horses: "My heart pains me, seeing a man driving horses." The horses said: "Listen, sheep, our hearts pain us when we see this: a man, the master, makes the wool of the sheep into a warm garment for himself. And the sheep has no wool." Having heard this, the sheep fled into the plain.

Hirt (1939)

Lehmann and Zgusta (1979)

Danka (1986)

Adams (1997)

Lühr (2008)

Voyles and Barrack (2009)

Melchert (2009, revisited 2014)

Kortlandt (2007, revised 2010)

After the separation of Anatolian and Tocharian:

Byrd (2013)

Notable differences

However, many other differences are to be explained by widely diverging views on the phonological and morphological systems of PIE.

Schleichers reconstruction assumed that the o/e vocalism was secondary, and his version of PIE is much more closely based on Sanskrit than modern reconstructions.

Hirt introduced the o/e vocalism, syllabic resonants, labiovelars and palatalized velars.

Lehmann and Zgusta introduced a few alternative lexemes (the relative pronoun ; the word  'man'), and made some first steps into the direction of accepting laryngeals. Their text features an h for what they seem to accept as a single laryngeal of PIE.

Adams was the first one to fully reflect the laryngeal theory in his version of the fable. Judging from the text, he seems to assume four different laryngeal phonemes. Consequently, Adam's text no longer shows long ā.

Kortlandts version is a radical deviation from the prior texts in a number of ways. First, he followed the glottalic theory, writing glottalic plosives with a following apostrophe (t’) and omitting aspirated voiced plosives. Second, he substitutes the abstract laryngeal signs with their supposed phonetic values:  =  (glottal stop),  =  (pharyngeal fricative),  =  (pharyngeal fricative with lip rounding). Kortlandt also has a different opinion about ablaut grades in many verbal and nominal forms, compared to the other scholars.

In popular culture
PIE is used in a short dialogue between the human astronauts and an alien "Engineer" in Ridley Scott's movie Prometheus. In an early scene, the android 'David' (played by Michael Fassbender) practices reciting Schleicher's fable to the interactive computer, in preparation for first contact with the "Engineers". Linguist Anil Biltoo created the film's reconstructed dialogue and had an onscreen role teaching Schleicher's fable to David.

See also
The king and the god

References

Bibliography
Arntz, Helmut (ed.), Hirt, Hermann: Die Hauptprobleme der indogermanischen Sprachwissenschaft. Niemeyer, Halle a.d. Saale 1939 (Sammlung kurzer Grammatiken germanischer Dialekte. B. Ergänzungsheft 4)
Kortlandt, Frederik. 2007. For Bernard Comrie.
Lehmann, W., and L. Zgusta. 1979. Schleicher's tale after a century. In Festschrift for Oswald Szemerényi on the Occasion of his 65th Birthday, ed. B. Brogyanyi, 455–66. Amsterdam.
Lühr, Rosemarie Von Berthold Delbrück bis Ferdinand Sommer: Die Herausbildung der Indogermanistik in Jena
Mallory, J. P. and Adams, D. Q.: Encyclopedia of Indo-European Culture. London, 1997. S. 500ff.
Schleicher, August: Fabel in indogermanischer Ursprache. In: Beiträge zur vergleichenden Sprachforschung auf dem Gebiete der arischen, celtischen und slawischen Sprachen. 5/1868. Dümmler, Berlin, S. 206-208

External links
Schleicher's reconstructed text with a literal English gloss
Telling Tales in Proto-Indo-European, an audio rendition of the fable

Proto-Indo-European language
Fables
1868 in science
History of science
1868 short stories
Comparison of Indo-European languages
Multilingual texts